Abdullah Nooh Bilal Al-Hamar, commonly known as Abdullah Al-Hamar, is an Omani professional footballer who plays for Al-Nasr in Oman Professional League.

Club career statistics

International career
Abdullah is part of the first team squad of the Oman national football team. He was selected for the national team for the first time in 2012. He made his first appearance for Oman  on 8 December 2012 against Lebanon in the 2012 WAFF Championship. He has made appearances in the 2012 WAFF Championship and the 2014 WAFF Championship.

References

External links
 
 Abdullah Al-Hamar at Goal.com
 
 

1992 births
Living people
People from Salalah
Omani footballers
Oman international footballers
Association football midfielders
Al-Nasr SC (Salalah) players
Oman Professional League players